The Mocapajuba Marine Extractive Reserve is a coastal marine extractive reserve in the state of Pará, Brazil.

Location

The Mocapajuba Marine Extractive Reserve is in the municipality of São Caetano de Odivelas, Pará.
The reserve covers the mangroves in the São Caetano de Odivelas peninsula and islands of the coastal delta formed by the Barreto and Mocajuba rivers.
It adjoins the São João da Ponta Extractive Reserve to the southeast and the Mãe Grande de Curuçá Extractive Reserve to the east.

History

The reserve is one of three created by president Dilma Rousseff thirteen days before the 2014 presidential elections.
The other two are the Mestre Lucindo and Cuinarana marine extractive reserves, both also in Pará.

The reserve is administered by the Chico Mendes Institute for Biodiversity Conservation (ICMBio).
It is classed as IUCN protected area category VI (protected area with sustainable use of natural resources)
The objectives are to conserve biodiversity of the ecosystems of mangroves, salt marshes, dunes, wetlands, floodplains, rivers, estuaries and islands and ensure sustainable use of natural resources while protecting the livelihoods and culture of the traditional extractive  communities of the region.

Notes

Sources

Marine extractive reserves of Brazil
Protected areas of Pará
2014 establishments in Brazil
Protected areas established in 2014